Youth Party may refer to:

Aotearoa NZ Youth Party
Chinese Youth Party
Croatian Youth Party
Egypt Youth Party
Great Japan Youth Party
Indonesian Youth Party
Rally for Independent Forces/Party of the Youth of Burkina
Socialist Youth (Portugal)
Syrian National Youth Party
Young Party, a political party in Turkey
Youth Movement (Laos), also known as the Youth Party
Youth Congress Party
Youth International Party
Youth Party of Ukraine
Youth Party – European Greens, a political party in Slovenia
Malaysian United Democratic Alliance, also known as Parti MUDA (Muda in malay meaning youth)

See also
Youth wing